Nedumudi Venu (22 May 1948 – 11 October 2021) was an Indian Malayalam actor known for his performances in Manichitrathazhu (1993), Indian (1996), Malootty (1990), Keli (1991), Marakkar (2021) and others.

Malayalam language films

1970s

1980s

1990s

2000s

2010s

2020s

Films in other language

Tamil 
{| class="wikitable"
|+
!Year
!Film
!Role
!Notes
|-
| 1995 || Mogamul || Ranganna || Tamil debut
|-
| 1996 || Indian || Inspector Krishnaswamy ||
|-
| 2005 || Anniyan || Ambi's father ||
|-
| rowspan=2 | 2008 || Poi Solla Porom || K. R. Sathyanathan ||
|-
|| Silambattam || Vichu's grandfather ||
|-
| 2019 || Sarvam Thaala Mayam || Vembhu Iyer ||
|-
| 2021 || Navarasa || School Principal (Segment - Summer of 92') || Web-series
|-
| 2023 ||  || Inspector Krishnaswamy || Filming  
|}

 English 

 2007 Chaurahen Sanskrit 

 2016  Ishti Television Shakunam (Doordarshan)
 Kairali Vilasam Lodge (Doordarshan) (Direction, acting)
 Verukal (Doordarshan) (based on the novel by Malayattoor Ramakrishnan )
 Jwalayayi  (Doordarshan)
 Manasariyum Yanthram  (Doordarshan)
 Poovanpazham (Telefilm) (Doordarshan)
 Gandharvayamam (Asianet)
 Swapnam (Asianet)
 Sparsham (Asianet)
 Avasthantarangal (Kairali TV)
 Oomakkuyil (Surya TV)
 Raagardram (Doordarshan)
 Sree Guruvayorappan (Surya TV)
 Prayanam (Surya TV)
 Peythozhiyathe (Surya TV)
 Kunjalimarakkar (Asianet)
 Sreekrishnan''  (Surya TV)

References 

Indian filmographies
Male actor filmographies